Scourge is the fourth studio album by British thrash metal band Xentrix. It was released in 1996 through Heavy Metal Records. It is the only album to feature vocalist Simon Gordon and guitarist Andy Rudd, and their final one with bassist Paul "Macka" MacKenziel. The album was also Xentrix's final studio album for more than two decades, until the release of Bury the Pain in 2019.

Track listing
All songs written by Xentrix.

Personnel
Xentrix 
Simon Gordon -Vocals
Andy Rudd  - Rhythm Guitar
Dennis Gasser - Drums
Paul "Macka" MacKenzie - Bass
Kristian "Stan" Havard - Lead Guitar

Production
Mark Freshney  -Cover art
Mark Stuart  - Producer, Engineering, Mixing
Huw Lloyd-Jones  - Cover art
Martin Talbot -  Band Photos

References

External sites
Xentrix - Scourge

1996 albums
Xentrix albums